Aiterach is a river of Bavaria, Germany. It flows into the Danube near Straubing.

See also
List of rivers of Bavaria

References

Rivers of Bavaria
Rivers of Germany
Straubing-Bogen
Dingolfing-Landau